WXAN is a radio station airing a Southern Gospel Music format licensed to Ava, Illinois, broadcasting on 103.9 MHz FM.  The station serves the areas of Carbondale, Illinois, Murphysboro, Illinois, Du Quoin, Illinois, and Pinckneyville, Illinois and is owned by Mountain Valley Media, LLC.

The station was founded in 1982 by Harold and Carlene Lawder.  In 2021 Danny and Lee Ann Hood purchased WXAN.  Specific programming includes nationally syndicated preachers and pastors Adrian Rodgers, Charles Stanley, Jack Graham, and David Jeremiah.  The General Manager of WXAN is Will Stephens.  Stephens hosts "The Will Stephens Show" weekdays from 12 noon - 1 pm.  The shoe features interviews with Illinois newsmakers.  WXAN is also the voice of Pinckneyville Panther sports.

References

External links
WXAN's official website

Southern Gospel radio stations in the United States
XAN